Martina Crhová (born 17 June 1988) is a Czech handball player for Kristianstad Handboll and the Czech national team.

She represented the Czech Republic at the 2013 World Women's Handball Championship in Serbia.

References

External links

Czech female handball players
1988 births
Living people
Sportspeople from Prague
Expatriate handball players
Czech expatriate sportspeople in Sweden
21st-century Czech women